Glenn Muenkat (born 3 January 1999) is a Canadian soccer player who plays as a midfielder.

Club career

Early career
After moving to from Toronto to Ottawa with his family at age four, Muenkat began playing soccer at age five with Ottawa Internationals. In 2013, he joined the academy programme of Major League Soccer side Toronto FC. In 2016, he played with Toronto FC III in League1 Ontario, scoring six goals in eighteen league appearances as well as in the Premier Development League with one goal in eight appearances.

The following season, he made another four league appearances for Toronto FC III before signing abroad with the academy of 2. Bundesliga side 1. FC Kaiserslautern. At Kaiserslautern, he played for the U-19 and U-21 teams, making seven appearances for the U-19s and scoring two goals for the U-21s.

Valour FC
On 8 January 2019, Muenkat returned to Canada and signed with Canadian Premier League side Valour FC. On 8 May 2019, he made his professional debut as a starter in a 1–0 loss to Cavalry FC. That season, Muenkat made thirteen league appearances, including two starts, and one appearance in the Canadian Championship. On 29 November 2019, the club announced that Muenkat would not be returning for the 2020 season.

International career
In 2013 and 2014, Muenkat participated in two Canada U15 identification camps, and was later called up to two Canada U18 camps in 2015 and 2016.

References

External links

1999 births
Living people
Association football midfielders
Canadian soccer players
Soccer players from Toronto
Canadian expatriate soccer players
Canadian expatriate sportspeople in Germany
Expatriate footballers in Germany
Toronto FC players
1. FC Kaiserslautern players
Valour FC players
League1 Ontario players
Canadian Premier League players